The year 568 BC was a year of the pre-Julian Roman calendar. In the Roman Empire, it was known as year 186 Ab urbe condita. The denomination 568 BC for this year has been used since the early medieval period, when the Anno Domini calendar era became the prevalent method in Europe for naming years.

Events
 Amtalqa succeeds his brother Aspelta as king of Kush.

Births

Deaths
 Pittacus of Mytilene, one of the Seven Sages of Greece
 Aspelta, king of Kush

References